The 1969 Gael Linn Cup, the most important representative competition for elite level participants in the women's team field sport of camogie, was won by Leinster, who defeated Munster in the final, played at Cahir, .

Arrangements
Munster defeated Connacht 2–2 to 0–4 in the semifinal at Athenry on 4 October with goals by Ann Comerford and Beatrice Lawrence. Leinster defeated Ulster 7–5 to 1–4 at Croke Park. Leinster won the final by 5–4 to 2–2. Agnes Hourigan wrote in the Irish Press: The winners won because they played as a team and passed out quickly to a team-mate when challenged and surrounded. Munster, who were also fine players, were a side of individuals and paid the price in lost chances.

Final stages

|}

References

External links
 Camogie Association

1969 in camogie
1969